Helmuth Kiesel (born 1 August 1947) is a German literary studies scholar who specializes in German literature from the period 1918 to 1945. He was professor of modern German literature at the University of Bamberg from 1987 to 1990 and at the Heidelberg University from 1990. Since 2015 he has been professor emeritus.

Kiesel's 720 pages long biography of Jünger, Ernst Jünger.

Selected bibliography
 with : Gesellschaft und Literatur im 18. Jahrhundert. Voraussetzungen und Entstehung des literarischen Markts in Deutschland. Beck, Munich 1977, .
 „Bei Hof, bei Höll“. Untersuchungen zur literarischen Hofkritik von Sebastian Brant bis Friedrich Schiller. Dissertation. Niemeyer, Tübingen 1979, .
 Erich Kästner. Beck, Munich 1981, .
 Literarische Trauerarbeit. Das Exil- und Spätwerk Alfred Döblins. Habilitation thesis. Niemeyer, Tübingen 1986, .
 Wissenschaftliche Diagnose und dichterische Vision der Moderne. Max Weber und Ernst Jünger. Manutius, Heidelberg 1994, .
 Geschichte der literarischen Moderne. Sprache, Ästhetik, Dichtung im 20. Jahrhundert. Beck, Munich 2004, .
 Ernst Jünger. Die Biografie. Siedler, Munich 2007, .
 Geschichte der deutschsprachigen Literatur 1918 bis 1933. C.H. Beck, Munich 2017, .

References

1947 births
Living people
German literary historians
German literature academics
Academic staff of the University of Bamberg
Academic staff of Heidelberg University